Sivasubramaniyan Shankar (born 13 February 1971) is an Indian former first-class cricketer. He is now an umpire and has stood in matches in the 2015–16 Ranji Trophy.

References

External links
 

1971 births
Living people
Indian cricketers
Indian cricket umpires
Kerala cricketers
Cricketers from Kochi
People from Mattancherry